The Warning Signal is a 1926 American silent action drama film directed by Charles J. Hunt and starring Gladys Hulette, Lincoln Stedman and Clarence Burton.

Synopsis
The son of a railroad owner wants to make his own way in the world, and so takes a job with the company under an assumed identity. He battles with a rival and manages to thwart a dangerous collision. At the end he is promoted to president of the railroad by his father.

Cast
 Gladys Hulette		
 Kent Mead		
 Lincoln Stedman	
 Clarence Burton		
 Martha Mattox	
 William H. Turner		
 Joseph W. Girard

References

Bibliography
 Robert B. Connelly. The Silents: Silent Feature Films, 1910-36, Volume 40, Issue 2. December Press, 1998.

External links
 

1926 films
1926 drama films
1920s English-language films
American silent feature films
Silent American drama films
American black-and-white films
Films directed by Charles J. Hunt
1920s American films